In Stereo is the eleventh studio album by English musical duo Bananarama. It was released on 19 April 2019 and was the group's first full-length release in 10 years.

"Dance Music" was released on 18 January 2019 as a promotional single to launch the album campaign. "Stuff Like That" was released on 7 March 2019 as the lead single. The song was added to the A-List of the BBC Radio 2 playlist, and reached number 22 on the UK Airplay Chart for the week ending 11 April 2019. The music video for "Stuff Like That" saw Bananarama reunite with director and long-time collaborator Andy Morahan, who hadn't directed any of their music videos since "Preacher Man" in 1990. 

It was confirmed on 17 May 2019 via Twitter that "Looking For Someone" would be released as the album's second single on 24 May 2019.

The opening track, "Love in Stereo", is a song that was originally written and recorded by British girl group the Sugababes, who later gave it to Bananarama.

The album entered at number 29 on the UK Albums Chart, as well as entering the Australian album chart at 23, and the independent album chart at 5.

Track listing

Notes
  signifies a vocal producer

Charts

References

2019 albums
Albums produced by Richard X
Bananarama albums